The Silver Gymnasium is the seventh album by American indie rock band Okkervil River, released on September 3, 2013. It is the band's first release after signing to ATO Records, and their first album not released through Jagjaguwar.

Overview
The Silver Gymnasium was first announced in June 2013, its name revealed letter-by-letter via the band's website. The record is a concept album which takes place in lead-singer Will Sheff's home-town of Meriden, New Hampshire in 1986. Sheff conceived the album as a tribute to the spirit of pre-adolescence, meant to evoke the nostalgic feeling of, in his words “an action figure you found in the woods.” The album's title is taken from the Charles Lewis Silver Memorial Gymnasium found in Meriden's Kimball Union Academy, the boarding school that Sheff attended.

Reception

The album has been given a Metacritic rating of 78 out of 100 based on 32 critics, indicating generally favorable reviews. At Alternative Press, Chris Parker called the album "Often dark, but strangely triumphant."

The album charted at No. 66 on Billboard 200,  and No. 7 on the Billboard Tastemaker album chart, selling 5,800 copies in the first week. The album has sold 22,000 copies in the United States as of August 2016.

Track listing

Bonus tracks
 "Do the Crawl (CBS October 22, 1988)" – 4:43 Vinyl exclusive
 "From a Cutlass Cruiser" – 3:40 Vinyl exclusive

Charts

References

Okkervil River albums
2013 albums
ATO Records albums
Albums produced by John Agnello